Adhesion G-protein coupled receptor A3 (ADGRA3), also known as GPR125, is an adhesion GPCR that in humans is encoded by the Adgra3 gene (previously Gpr125).

References

Further reading

G protein-coupled receptors